Pontycymmer railway station served the village of Pontycymer, in the historical county of Glamorganshire, Wales, from 1889 to 1953 on the Garw Valley Railway.

History 
The station was opened on 1 June 1889 by the Great Western Railway, although it was used earlier by miners in 1877. It was also shown earlier in Bradshaw, although the first train was shown in July 1889. It closed on 9 February 1953.

References 

Disused railway stations in Bridgend County Borough
Former Great Western Railway stations
Railway stations in Great Britain opened in 1889
Railway stations in Great Britain closed in 1953
1889 establishments in Wales
1953 disestablishments in Wales